Puccinellia laurentiana is a perennial grass which grows on gravelly seashores in south-eastern Canada. Its specific epithet "laurentiana" refers to the Gulf of St. Lawrence, where it grows.

Description

Basal leaf sheaths can be somewhat white. The branches are ascending. The palea are lanceolate and scabrous above. The grass typically flowers from July into early August.

P. laurentiana resembles Puccinellia coarctata and Puccinellia vaginata, but differs from both in its abruptly acuminate whitish lemmas and stiff involute leaves. It additionally differs from P. coarctata in its lemmas' pubescent nerves.

Habitat and distribution

Puccinellia laurentiana grows on gravelly seashores and sea cliffs in south-eastern Quebec and north-eastern New Brunswick, often on the Gulf of St. Lawrence for which it is named. It can rarely be found in Nova Scotia and Maine.

References

laurentiana
Plants described in 1916